Jayne Eastwood (born December 17, 1946), also credited as Jane Easton or Jane Eastwood, is a Canadian actress and comedian. She is best known for her film roles as Anna-Marie Biddlecoff in the comedy film Finders Keepers (1984), Judy the Waitress in the Christmas film The Santa Clause (1994), Mrs. White in My Big Fat Greek Wedding (2002) and its 2016 sequel, Mrs. Borusewicz in Chicago (2002), Lucy Decker in the comedy Welcome to Mooseport (2004) and Miss Wimsey in the musical film Hairspray (2007).

She appeared in television roles including Gwen Twining in King of Kensington (1978–1980), Bernice in Material World, Aunt Agatha Flugelschmidt in the PBS Kids children's television series Noddy (1998–2000), Jeannie in Wild Card (2003), Bridget in Train 48 (2004–2005), Ronnie Sacks in This Is Wonderland (2005–2006), Maxine Bingly in Billable Hours (2006–2008), Miss Wispinski in Little Mosque on the Prairie (2008–2011) and Gloria Verrano in Haven (2013–2015).

Her voice roles include Birthday Bear in The Care Bears Family, Mrs. Rockchewer in The Neverending Story, Mrs. Kersplatski in Jojo's Circus, Lady Rataxes in Babar and the Adventures of Badou and Momma in Scaredy Squirrel.

Early life
Eastwood was born and raised in Hoggs Hollow of York Mills Road, in Toronto, Ontario. Her childhood was spent at a cottage in Muskoka, skiing in Collingwood, Ontario during winter and attending Northern Secondary School. She had attended a short class at the York Mills Collegiate Institute.

Career
Eastwood's career was initially a painter. She ventured into acting when a commercial artist and friend of hers had invited her to play a role in a local play, Suddenly, Last Summer. A teacher, who was in the audience and revealed to be an acting agent, realized her potential.

Her very first noticeable acting roles were in various commercials for Sani Flush, Scope, Facelle Royale, Paris Pat, Toyota, Wintario, and Molson Golden gang commercials with friends Gilda Radner and Andrea Martin.

A veteran character actor who has appeared in films since 1970, Eastwood made an indelible mark on Canadian cinema early as the pregnant Betty in Don Shebib's classic Goin’ Down the Road. She was one of the original cast members of the Toronto branch of The Second City comedy troupe and was a semiregular on SCTV. She was in the original Toronto production of Godspell.

In 2005, she joined the cast of This Is Wonderland, a courtroom comedy drama. In 2007, she played Miss Wimsey in  Hairspray. She is currently working in the Toronto theatrical production, Women Fully Clothed."

She has been a voice actor in ALF: The Animated Series, Annedroids, Best Ed, Bob and Margaret, Dino Dan: Trek's Adventures, Half a Pantaloon, JoJo's Circus, Monster by Mistake, Peep and the Big Wide World, and Babar and the Adventures of Badou. In 2013, she joined the cast of Haven as Dr. Gloria Veranno. She appears in seasons four and five.

Awards
In 2013, she received the National Award of Excellence from ACTRA.

In 2019, she received the Award of Excellence at the Toronto ACTRA Awards.

At the 7th Canadian Screen Awards in 2019, Eastwood won the award for Best Supporting Performance in a Digital Program or Series for her appearance in the web series The Writers' Block. At the 9th Canadian Screen Awards in 2021, she won the award for Best Lead Performance in a Digital Program or Series for Hey Lady!''.

Personal life
Eastwood is the widow of David Flaherty, who was a film and television writer, and brother of SCTV alumnus Joe Flaherty.

Filmography

Film

Television

References

External links

1946 births
Living people
Actresses from Toronto
Canadian film actresses
Canadian voice actresses
Canadian television actresses
Comedians from Toronto
20th-century Canadian actresses
21st-century Canadian actresses
Canadian sketch comedians
Canadian women comedians
Best Supporting Actress in a Television Film or Miniseries Canadian Screen Award winners
Canadian Comedy Award winners